Arjun Bijlani (born 31 October 1982) is an Indian actor who predominantly works in Hindi television and reality shows.

Bijlani made his television debut with Ekta Kapoor's show Kartika on Hungama TV. Subsequently, he proved himself as a leading star with his performances in various well-known shows like Left Right Left, Miley Jab Hum Tum, Meri Aashiqui Tum Se Hi, Naagin, Kavach, Pardes Mein Hai Mera Dil, Ishq Mein Marjawan and Roohaniyat. On the non-fictional front, he participated in Jhalak Dikhhla Jaa 9 and Smart Jodi and hosted Dance Deewane. Arjun's first Bollywood film Direct Ishq was released in 2016. In 2020, he debuted into digital world with the web series State Of Siege on ZEE5. In 2021, he participated in Fear Factor: Khatron Ke Khiladi 11 and emerged as the winner.

Early life
Arjun Bijlani was born on 31 October 1982 in Bombay, Maharashtra, to a Sindhi Father and a  Maharashtrian Mother. He did his schooling from Bombay Scottish School, Mahim and his college from H.R. College of Commerce and Economics. He also has a younger brother, Niranjan Bijlani and a sister, Rohini. At the age of nineteen, he lost his father Sudarshan Bijlani.

Personal life
Bijlani married his longtime girlfriend,  Neha Swami on 20 May 2013. On 21 January 2015, they became parents to a baby boy whom they named Ayaan Bijlani.

Career

Arjun started his television career in 2004 with Balaji Telefilms' youth-based series Kartika opposite Jennifer Winget. He played the role of Ankush, Kartika's love interest. In 2005, Bijlani appeared in another youth television show Remix, playing the role of Vikram. Bijlani had his first noticeable role in the action-based television drama Left Right Left as Cadet Aalekh Sharma.

In 2008, he played Sanjay, a rich fun-loving guy in Deepti Bhatnagar's period drama Mohe Rang De. The same year, he featured in the romantic youth show Miley Jab Hum Tum alongside Rati Pandey, Sanaya Irani and Mohit Sehgal. He played Mayank Sharma, a nerd who falls for a fun-loving girl. This was his first show as a leading actor which received high TRPs. The show ended on 19 November 2010. His next television venture was NDTV Imagine's Pardes Mein Mila Koi Apna alongside Bhavna Khatri. He played the role of Chandrakant Bhosale in the show.

In 2012, Arjun hosted UTV Bindass's reality talk show Dell Inspiron Road Diaries. The same year, he also acted in Magic Lantern's telefilm Teri Meri Love Stories on Star Plus opposite Neha Janpandit where he played the role of Raghu, an uncultured guy. Next, he did short films like Full Phukre, I Guess and Caught in the Web. He also appeared as Dev, a police inspector in the television series Kaali – Ek Punar Avatar opposite Aneri Vajani. His next appearance in 2013 was in the series Chintu Ban Gaya Gentleman. His final appearance in 2013 was in the comedy-based cookery drama Jo Biwi Se Kare Pyaar on SAB TV, where he played the role of Aditya Khanna opposite Shweta Gulati. In 2014, he was a player on Box Cricket League.

In 2014, Bijlani featured in an episode of UTV Bindass's Yeh Hai Aashiqui named alongside Perneet Chauhan and Rucha Gujarathi. In March 2015, he entered Balaji Telefilms' romantic television drama series Meri Aashiqui Tumse Hi alongside Radhika Madan and Shakti Arora. He played the role of Shikhar Mehra, a casanova lawyer yet a positive guy who falls in love with Ishani (Radhika Madan). He quit the show in August 2015.

In September 2015, he signed another thriller show of Balaji Telefilms, Naagin, opposite Mouni Roy. The show aired on Colors TV. In the show, he portrayed a suave and ambitious business tycoon, Ritik Singh, who believes that love and religion are distractions, as they make you weak, but his beliefs are challenged when he comes face-to-face with Roy's character Shivanya. The show received high TRPs and proved to be a turning point in his career. In 2016, he made his Bollywood debut with Baba Motion Pictures' Direct Ishq, co-starring Rajneesh Duggal and Nidhi Subbaiah. He played the role of Kabir Bajpai, a good boy from a rich family, but the film failed at the box office. In July 2016, Bijlani participated in the dance reality show Jhalak Dikhhla Jaa 9, but later got eliminated along with Surveen Chawla.

In August 2016, he entered Colors TV's Kavach...Kaali Shaktiyon Se starring Mona Singh and Vivek Dahiya, where he played Arhaan, a genie. He also made a guest appearance in Naagin 2 for a few episodes. In November 2016, he played Raghav Mehra in Pardes Mein Hai Mera Dil opposite Drashti Dhami. The show ended on 30 June 2017 due to low TRP's.

In September 2017, Bijlani signed Beyond Dreams Entertainment's   Ishq Mein Marjawan which aired on Colors TV, as Deep Raj Singh. The show received good TRPs and ended in June 2019. In 2018, he anchored the dance reality show Dance Deewane. In 2019, Bijlani hosted Colors TV's cooking reality show, Kitchen Champion 5 and made a guest appearance in Naagin 3 for a few episodes.

In 2019, he hosted Dance Deewane 2 on Colors TV. In January 2020, he appeared in a music video named Kehndi Haan Kehndi Naa alongside Sukriti Kakar and Prakriti Kakar. In March 2020, he made his digital debut with State of Siege produced by Contiloe Pictures and distributed by Zee5. He played the role of Major Nikhil Manikrishnan, inspired by Major Sandeep Unnikrishnan. The same year, he appeared in another music video named Ishq Tanha alongside Reem Shaikh.

In 2021, he participated in the stunt-based reality show Fear Factor: Khatron Ke Khiladi 11 on Colors TV. The show was hosted by Rohit Shetty and filmed in Cape Town, South Africa. Bijlani emerged as the winner of the series, beating Divyanka Tripathi and Vishal Aditya Singh in the finale.

In January 2022, he hosted Sony TV's India's Got Talent. In February 2022, he participated in Star Plus's Smart Jodi along with his wife, Neha Bijlani and emerged as the 2nd runner-up. The same year, he starred in MX Player's popular web series Roohaniyat as Saveer Rathod which was a super hit. In June 2022, he hosted Star Plus's Ravivaar With Star Parivaar alongside singer Amaal Malik. In November 2022, he replaced Rannvijay Singha to Host the fourteenth season of the show MTV Splitsvilla.

Filmography

Films

Television

Web series

Music videos

Awards

See also

 List of Indian television actors

References

External links

Sindhi people
Indian male television actors
Living people
Male actors in Hindi television
Indian male soap opera actors
21st-century Indian male actors
1982 births
Fear Factor: Khatron Ke Khiladi participants